Pradosia decipiens is a species of plant in the family Sapotaceae endemic to Brazil.  It is threatened by habitat loss.

References

Flora of Brazil
decipiens
Critically endangered plants
Taxonomy articles created by Polbot
Taxa named by Adolpho Ducke